Walter Steven Ris (January 4, 1924 – December 25, 1989) was an American competition swimmer, two-time Olympic champion, and world record-holder.

Ris won two gold medals at the 1948 Summer Olympics in London, England.  He received his first gold medal as a member of the winning U.S. team in the men's 4×200-meter freestyle relay, and set a new world record of 8:46.0 with American teammates Jimmy McLane, Wally Wolf, and Bill Smith.

At the US Olympic trials of the 1948 4x200-meter freestyle relay, several swimmers who had already qualified in other events slowed down in their heats or swam fast in the prelims and scratched themselves for the final to allow more swimmers to qualify for the US Olympic Team.

Ultimately, coach Robert Kiphuth did hold a time trial shortly after the actual trials with eleven of the swimmers.  This time trial had Jimmy McLane as first overall with a time of 2:11.0, Bill Smith and Wally Wolf in 2:11.2, and Wally Ris in 2:12.4.  This quartet was used for the Olympic final.  The next four-Eugene Rogers in 2:14.2, Edwin Gilbert in 2:15.4, Robert Gibe in 2:15.6, and William Dudley in 2:15.9, were used in the Olympic prelims. The next three swimmers-Joe Verdeur who came in 2:16.3, Alan Ford in 2;16.4 and George Hoogerhyde in 2:17.4 were not used in any capacity in the 4x200 freestyle relay.

In individual competition, he won a second gold in the men's 100-meter freestyle (57.3), finishing a half-second ahead of U.S. teammate Alan Ford (57.8).

Ris was a star swimmer at Crane Technical High in Chicago.  He then attended the University of Iowa, where he was a member of the Iowa Beta chapter of Sigma Alpha Epsilon and swam for the Iowa Hawkeyes swimming and diving team in National Collegiate Athletic Association (NCAA) and Big Ten Conference competition from 1947 to 1949.  He was the NCAA national champion in the 100-yard freestyle in 1948 and 1949.

Ris was inducted into the International Swimming Hall of Fame as an "Honor Swimmer" in 1966.

He was born in Chicago, Illinois and died in Mission Viejo, California.

See also
 List of members of the International Swimming Hall of Fame
 List of multiple Olympic gold medalists at a single Games
 List of Olympic medalists in swimming (men)
 List of University of Iowa people
 World record progression 4 × 200 metres freestyle relay

References

External links 

 
 
 Des Mines Register online: '48 Olympics champ Ris into 'Hall'
 Chicago Tribune: Walter Ris, Swimmer Who Won Olympic Gold (obituary)

1924 births
1989 deaths
American male freestyle swimmers
World record setters in swimming
Iowa Hawkeyes men's swimmers
Olympic gold medalists for the United States in swimming
Swimmers from Chicago
Swimmers at the 1948 Summer Olympics
Medalists at the 1948 Summer Olympics